Juan José Caicedo Calderón (born 27 July 1992) is an Ecuadorian discus thrower. He competed in the 2020 Summer Olympics.

References

1992 births
Living people
Sportspeople from Quito
People from San Lorenzo, Ecuador
Athletes (track and field) at the 2020 Summer Olympics
Ecuadorian male athletes
Olympic athletes of Ecuador
Pan American Games competitors for Ecuador
Athletes (track and field) at the 2019 Pan American Games
21st-century Ecuadorian people